The PNR Hyundai Rotem DMU is a diesel multiple unit (DMU) train operated by the Philippine National Railways (PNR) since 2009.

Purchase
During the administration of then-President Gloria Macapagal Arroyo, a project to rehabilitate the PNR Metro Commuter Line was pursued. The first phase of the Northrail-Southrail Linkage Project, includes the purchase of DMUs. 21 DMU cars that can be configured into seven three-car sets were planned to be procured. However, due to budget constraints, the order was downgraded to 18 DMU cars or six three-car sets, as the budget was not enough to cover the seven sets.

In 2007, the South Korean consortium of Daewoo, Hanjin Heavy Industries and Construction, and Rotem was awarded the contract for the first phase of the Northrail-Southrail Linkage project. The consortium was appointed by PNR by way of negotiated procurement, wherein the government directly negotiates with contractors in case of an emergency. This happened after two failed biddings in early 2007.

The US$49.096-million project was funded by a US$50.42-million loan from the Export–Import Bank of Korea.

Design

Car body
The train was introduced as the first lightweight, stainless steel made trainsets of the PNR in 2009.

When the trains first entered service, there were two livery variants. There were DMUs that sported a silver-colored body and orange lining with white-colored front cabs and the old PNR logo used in the 1960s. Another was a variant with the same silver-colored body and orange lining but with the cabs sporting colors of white and blue, and stylized PNR FilTrack logos on the side windows of the front cabs and in the middle of the ITR car.

By 2015, all remaining active DMU units sported a navy blue livery, while still maintaining the orange lining in its sides.

The current livery used since 2019 has orange at the front and the body is mostly covered white with blue stripes at the side. The PNR logo is placed at the front of the Rotem DMUs.

Interior
The seats of the trains are longitudinal-type and are made up of fiber-reinforced plastic. There is an additional pair of single-leaf doors at the driver cab.

The design capacity of a three-car trainset is 674 passengers.

Bogies and electrical components
The front and rear bogies of the DMR cars are engine-propelled driven, while the bogies under the ITR cars are trailer bogies. Each DMU has two sets of auxiliary power supply units under the ITR cars which generates three-phase 380V AC and additional 220V AC.

Formation

Operations
The PNR Hyundai Rotem DMU fleet  entered service on July 14, 2009, coinciding with the launch of the new PNR system and logo. The line eventually was extended to Sucat and up until Alabang on April 19, 2010. Plans were made for the possible upgrade of the trains in 2011, however, due to the procurement of the 203 series as the new main vehicles, the plan was scrapped.

The trains are currently being used in Metro North Commuter services running from Governor Pascual station to Bicutan.

Refurbishments
In July 2015, the then-Department of Transportation and Communications (later the Department of Transportation) conducted a bidding for the refurbishment of nine vehicles, equivalent to three sets. However, after the bidding period ended in September 2015, no new reports have surfaced in this refurbishment.

In November 2019, DMU Sets 05 and 06 received their new livery. The window mesh screens were removed for the installation of polycarbonate panels. The new panels eliminated the need of the window mesh screens as these are virtually shatterproof and can better withstand stoning and debris.

Status
As of November 2022, two sets are currently active and are serving the Metro North Commuter (Gov. Pascual-Bicutan) Line.

DMU 06's configuration was DMR-10, ITR-06, & DMR-06 while the damaged DMU 05's original configuration was DMR-09, ITR-05, & DMR-05. The configuration was from November 2020 to December 2021. DMR-09 & DMR-10 had swapped their designated sets in December 2021 due to technical reasons.

Other sets are currently idle, swapped from their initial formations, with some damaged from accidents, awaiting repair and refurbishment.

DMU set 6s DMR 9 is damaged by a crane in the NLEX Connector construction site in Sampaloc. It is now at the Caloocan workshop, and if not repaired, will be most likely declared Beyond Economical Repair. DMR 2 has been refurbished and takes its place, enabling the set to run again.

Gallery

Accidents and incidents
 On April 29, 2011, DMR-11 of the original DMU Set 06 collided with a Coca-Cola truck at Manalac Crossing located in Tanyag, Taguig.
 On May 19, 2014, a DMU train collided with a jeepney in the Balic-Balic railroad crossing while operating a southbound train. A person was dead and more than 6 are injured. The accident caused delays in the train operations.
 On April 29, 2015, DMU Set 03 derailed between EDSA railway station and Nichols railway station. There were 50 reported injuries, mostly minor cases. The incident was caused by missing parts of the railtracks that were stolen. This however, prompted PNR operations to be suspended on May 5, 2015, to conduct safety tests by PNR and TÜV Rheinland. The operations of the PNR resumed on July 23, 2015.
 On January 1, 2020, DMU Set 05's windshield was shattered due to a stoning incident while performing an MNC Trip at Caloocan. The glass window was replaced with polycarbonate the day after the incident. It was also found that a group of minors were the ones who did the crime.
On June 3, 2020, DMU Set 06 rammed a car at Abad Santos Railroad Crossing in Tondo, Manila. The crossing barrier was not down when the accident happened.
On September 2, 2021, a DMU train rammed a blue car at the Piy Margal Railroad Crossing in Manila despite early warning by the crossing keepers. No injuries were reported. The PNR management is yet to release a statement about the absence of barriers at the railroad crossing, particularly at the southbound lane.
On September 25, 2022, DMU set 6 collided with a crane while performing a MNC service in Sta. Mesa, Manila, causing three injuries. The crane involved in the accident was used for the NLEX Connector project. The front area of the train was smashed on the right side. No statements from the construction company nor PNR have been released so far. The damaged unit, DMR 09, was brought to the Caloocan shops after the accident.

See also

PNR rolling stock
PNR 900 class
PNR 2500 class
PNR 8000 class
PNR 8100 class
KiHa 52

Philippine rolling stock manufactured by Hyundai Rotem
 LRTA 1100 class
 LRTA 2000 class

Notes

References

Further reading

Philippine National Railways
Rolling stock of the Philippines
Train-related introductions in 2009
Hyundai Rotem multiple units